The Football Association of Malaysia (FAM) is the national governing body of football in Malaysia responsible for organising the Malaysia national football team within the country. The Football Association of Malaysia headquarters is located at Wisma FAM.

History

Pre-independence 

Football arrived in Malaya with the British. The locals soon picked up the game, and before long it was the country's leading sport. Towards the end of the 19th century, football was one of the central pillars of most sports clubs in Malaya. But it was not structured. Even when the Selangor Amateur Football League took shape in 1905 – which ensured proper administration and organisation – the competition was confined only to clubs in the Kuala Lumpur.

In 1921, the battleship HMS Malaya visited the country. After engaging local opposition in football and rugby, the officers and men of HMS Malaya decided to commemorate the matches by presenting trophies for annual competitions in both rugby and football in Malaya. A national tournament featuring all the states that made up Malaya was started. The competition, known as the Malaya Cup (later renamed the Malaysia Cup in 1963), has been continuously since then, except during the war years.

In 1926 the Selangor Amateur Football League was established, and in 1936 the Football Association of Selangor was formed and this association soon started organising tournaments and this inspired other states in Malaya to follow suit. Along the same year in 1926, the Football Associations of Perak, Selangor, Negeri Sembilan, Malacca and the Singapore Amateur Football Association, came together to form the Malayan Football Association (MFA), in order to field a Malayan team against an Australia side that visited Singapore that year.

In 1933, the MFA was revived to form the Football Association of Malaya (FAM). Initially, the FAM was based in Singapore. It was chiefly responsible for the running of the Malaya Cup competition. The annual tournament played along inter-state lines was a huge success.

The first president of FAM was Sir Andrew Caldecott followed by M.B. Shelley, Dr. J.S. Webster, S.D. Scott, R. Williamson and Adrian Clark, who served up until 1940 before Europe went on a full-scale war with Germany. In 1940, control of the FAM moved from Singapore to Malaya, with A.R. Singham becoming the first Asian secretary in 1941.

The FAM's first president after the war was J. E King, to be followed by H.P Byson, and then Dr. C Rawson, who served for two years before vacating for the first ever non-British personality to take over the helm.

In 1951, Tunku Abdul Rahman (who was to become the first Prime Minister of Malaysia) became the FAM president. It was under Tunku Abdul Rahman that football in Malaysia entered its next phase, with the FAM taking a much bigger role than just being the backbone in the organisation of the Malaysia Cup.

FAM was inducted as one of 14 founding members of the Asian Football Confederation (AFC) in 1956, before becoming a full-fledged member of FIFA two years later.

After independence 

Tunku Abdul Rahman's love for the game was the main catalyst which resulted in the construction of the Merdeka Stadium and in 1957 it became hallowed ground for all Malaysians when it was the venue chosen to announce Malaysia's independence from Britain.

It also signalled the birth of the Merdeka Tournament (Pestabola Merdeka) and was once called the ‘Mini Asia Cup’ around the 1960s to 1980s.

The Merdeka Tournament proved to be a huge success, inspiring similar tournaments like the Jakarta Anniversary Tournament in Indonesia, the King's Cup in Thailand and the President's Cup in South Korea. The inaugural tournament then the premier football competition in Asia was won by Hong Kong.

However, Malaya won the title three years in a row, in 1958 and in 1959, and sharing it with South Korea in 1960. The country qualified for the Football at the 1972 Summer Olympics in Munich and the 1980 Summer Olympics in Moscow.

Following the change in name to the Football Association of Malaysia in the early 1960s, Tunku Abdul Rahman continued to play a big role in the development of the game through various youth competitions.

Following his departure in 1974, the reins of the FAM was taken over by Malaysia's second Prime Minister, Tun Abdul Razak, who served for just one year. The post was then filled by Tan Sri Datuk Seri Setia Raja Hamzah Haji Abu Samah in 1976, who was the Minister for Trade and Industry at the time.

Between 1976 and 1984, various football activities were introduced under Tan Sri Datuk Seri Raja Hamzah, and Malaysian football reached a new height in the international arena following his appointment as the AFC president.

During the glory days of Malaysian football in the 1970s and 80s, names like Mokhtar Dahari, Santokh Singh and Soh Chin Ann would strike fear in teams all over Asia.

The FAM entered a new era of modernisation and professionalism when the Sultan of Pahang, Haji Ahmad Shah took over.

The Sultan was integral in the growth of football in the new era with the introduction of the semi-pro league in 1989 before the game went fully professional several years later. However, success on the football field for the national team was not forthcoming.

Among the high points in Malaysian football was the successful hosting of the 1997 FIFA World Youth Championship, as well as the organisation of the Premier League, which has been called the Malaysia League (M-League) since 2004. Among the low points the National teams suffered defeats never seen before at international stage.

On 13 September 2018, the FAM had been awarded AFC Dream Asia Awards in Developing Category. In 2019, the FAM also been awarded AFC Dream Asia Awards (Bronze) in Inspiring Category.

Associations affiliation 

State Football Association is the governing body of football for the states in Malaysia. The state FAs are responsible for co-ordinating football league and developing football in their region and also made up the structure of FAM as the official governing body of football in Malaysia.

There are 20 Football Associations affiliated to the FAM. Besides the 14 FAs with regional location, six others are affiliated units.

State affiliation 

  Perlis Football Association (PFA)
  Football Association of Penang (FAP)
  Kedah Football Association (KFA)
  Perak Football Association (PAFA)
  Football Association of Selangor (FAS)
  Kuala Lumpur Football Association (KLFA)
  Negeri Sembilan Football Association (NSFA)
  Melaka United Soccer Association (MUSA)
  Johor Football Association (JFA)
  Kelantan Football Association (KAFA)
  Terengganu Football Association (TFA)
  Pahang Football Association (PBNP)
  Football Association of Sarawak (FAS)
  Sabah Football Association (SAFA)

Affiliation units 

  Malaysian Malays Football Association (PBMM)
  Malaysian Chinese Football Association (MCFA)
  Malaysian Indian Sports Council (MISC)
  Royal Malaysia Police Football Association (RMPFA)
  Armed Forces Football Association (AFFA)
  Football Coaches Association of Malaysia (PJBM)

The State Associations have their own constitutions and structure. During the early amateur era of Malaysian football, most of the state FAs was made up of small organisation with only some bigger states have an active football league while the smaller FAs will send a team to compete in the Malaysia Cup.

Depending on the size of the state, the State Associations have district associations affiliated to them. Clubs are directly affiliated to the State Football Association alongside the District Football Association.

Each State conducts its own competitions. Competitions are at state level where the winners will have a chances to be nominated by their state FAs for promotion to Malaysia FAM League. There are also inter-district competitions such as Liga Bolasepak Rakyat.

Competitions 

The Football Association of Malaysia formerly runs all top football competitions in Malaysia before some of it was given to Football Malaysia LLP (FMLLP), which is now known as Malaysian Football League (MFL) as one of a privatisation effort for a professional football in Malaysia. The list below are the said competitions which now managed by Malaysia Football League:
 Liga Super
 Liga Premier
 Piala FA
 Piala Malaysia
 Piala Cabaran Malaysia
 Piala Sumbangsih (Super cup)
 MFL Cup (U23)

FAM will now focus on youth development football, women football and futsal Leagues and tournaments in Malaysia:
 Piala Presiden (U21)
 Piala Belia (U19)
 Piala Tun Sharifah Rodziah (Women's)
 Malaysia Premier Futsal League
 Malaysia Premier Futsal League (Women)
 Malaysia Futsal Cup

AFL is a subsidiary of MFL that is responsible to organize and manage amateur football league competition in Malaysia.
 Liga M3
 Liga M4
 Liga M5

Awards

Principals

Management

Executive committee 
 President: Hamidin Mohd Amin
 Deputy President: Subahan Kamal (Selangor), Mohd Yusoff Mahadi (Melaka)
 Vice-President: Joehari Ayub (Sabah), Ab Ghani Hassan (Negeri Sembilan), S. Sivasundaram (Selangor), Rosmadi Ismail (Kelantan)
 Other members: Ajisman Alias, Aminuddin Omar, Hishamudin Yahaya, Jefferey Low, Md Dali Wahid, Christopher Raj, Subkhiddin Mohd Saleh, Firdaus Mohamed, Suraya Yaacob, Shafizah Umamah Abdul Mutalib
 Advisor: Park Hang-seo

Standing committees 

Emergency
 Chairman: Dato' Hamidin Mohd Amin

Finance and Management
 Chairman: Dato' Hamidin Mohd Amin

Local competitions
 Chairman: Mohd Yusoff Mahadi
 Deputy chairman:  Mohd Firdaus Mohamed

International competitions
 Chairman: Mohd Joehari Mohd Ayob
 Deputy chairman: S. Sivasundaram

Referees
 Chairman: Subkhiddin Mohd Salleh
 Deputy chairman: Aminuddin Omar

Internal Audit
 Chairman: Ismail Karim
 Deputy chairman: Shafizah Umamah Abdul Mutalib

Women's Football
 Chairman: Suraya Yaacob
 Deputy chairman: Shafizah Umamah Abdul Mutalib

Technical and Youth Football Development
 Chairman: Subahan Kamal
 Deputy chairman: Christopher Raj

Futsal and Beach Soccer
 Chairman: Rosmadi Ismail
 Deputy chairman: Mohd Joehari Mohd Ayob

Sports Medicine
 Chairman: Ab. Ghani Hassan
 Deputy chairman: Mohd Hisamudin Yahaya

Media and Public Relations
 Chairman: Christopher Raj
 Deputy chairman: Datuk Suraya Yaacob

Security
 Chairman: Muhammad Sabtu Osman
 Deputy chairman: Azisman Alias

Integrity
 Chairman: Aseh Che Mat
 Deputy chairman: Mohd Mokhtar Mohd Shariff

FAM Judiciary

Disciplinary
 Chairman:  Datuk Baljit Singh Sidhu
 Deputy chairman: Abd Shukor Ahmad

Appeals
 Chairman: Mohd Mokhtar Mohd Shariff
 Deputy chairman: Sheikh Mohd Nasir Sheikh Mohd Sharif

Club licencing 

First Instance Body
 Chairman: Sheikh Mohd Nasir Sheikh Mohd Sharif

Appeals Body
 Chairman: Wirdawati Mohd Radzi

Treasurer 
 Chairman: Ismail Karim

National teams 
 Chairman: Dato' Hamidin Mohd Amin

Malaysia national football team
 Manager: Kim Pan Gon

Malaysia national under-23 football team
 Manager: Brad Maloney

Malaysia national under-22 football team
 Manager: Brad Maloney

Malaysia national under-19 football team
 Manager: Brad Maloney (interim)

Malaysia national under-16 football team
 Manager: Lim Guan Eng

Malaysia women's national football team
 Manager: Suraya Yaacob

Malaysia national futsal team
 Manager: Chiew Chun Yong

Malaysia women's national futsal team
 Manager: Shafizah Umamah Abdul Mutalib

FAM Club licensing department 

FAM Club Licensing Department will be handling all the related football clubs licensing matters for football clubs in Malaysia to participating in Liga Super, Liga Premier, Malaysia FAM League, Piala FA and Piala Malaysia tournaments. It also can get the football clubs to participating in AFC Champions League and AFC Cup tournaments. The FAM Club Licensing Department will issuing two documents for club licensing, namely:-
 FAM Club Licensing Manual
 FAM Club Licensing Regulations

Disciplinary problems 

FIFA's Disciplinary Committee sanctioned the Football Association of Malaysia (FAM) after serious crowd disturbances led to the abandonment of the 2018 FIFA World Cup Russia qualifying match between Malaysia and Saudi Arabia on Saturday 8 September.

After analysis of all the circumstances of the matter, in particular, the match officials' reports, FAM's positions as well as the relevant videos and pictures, and due to the seriousness of the incidents, the Disciplinary Committee decided that the next home match of the 'A' representative team of Malaysia in the 2018 FIFA World Cup qualifying competition (Malaysia v UAE on 17 November 2015) would be played behind closed doors without spectators. The committee also decided to impose a fine of 40,000 Swiss francs (180,000 Malaysian ringgit) and issued FAM with a warning.

Furthermore, the Disciplinary Committee decided that the match be declared to be lost by forfeit by Malaysia (0–3).

See also 
 Malaysia national football team
 Malaysia national under-23 football team
 Malaysia national under-22 football team
 Malaysia national under-19 football team
 Malaysia national under-16 football team
 National Football Development Programme of Malaysia
 Malaysia National eSport Team (eRimau Squad)

References

External links 
 

1933 establishments in British Malaya
Sports organizations established in 1933
Malaysia
Sports governing bodies in Malaysia
Association football governing bodies in Asia
Football in Malaysia